The Puerto Hormiga archaeological site is in the Bolivar department, Colombia, in the lower Magdalena basin near the Caribbean coast. It dates to 4000 - 3100 BC.

Its traces provide evidence of a semi-sedentary agricultural society in the making, whose members hunted and gathered shellfish. Middens of shells were found there. According to other findings, such as ceramic remains and abundant stone material, the nomadic peoples were beginning to complement their activities with small-scale horticulture and agriculture.

A shell ring of the Late Archaic period has been described at Puerto Hormiga. The Puerto Hormiga ring, found in a marsh, is composed primarily of clam shells. It has a clear interior plaza. Sherds of fiber-tempered and sand-tempered pottery, as well as stone tools, were found associated with the shell ring. The earliest have been dated to 3794 BC. The fiber-tempered pottery is "crude", formed from a single lump of clay. Sand-tempered coiled ceramics have also been found at Puerto Hormiga.

Notes

References
 
  
 
 

Archaeological sites in Colombia
Former populated places in Colombia
Buildings and structures in Bolívar Department
Shell rings